Ireland Park is located on the shores of Lake Ontario on Éireann Quay, adjoining the Canada Malting Silos, at the foot of Bathurst Street in Toronto, Ontario, Canada. Officially opened in the summer of 2007, Ireland Park commemorates the tens of thousands who fled Ireland during the Great Famine. In 1847, over 38,000 Irish men, women and children landed at Rees's Wharf on the shores of Toronto, fleeing famine and eager to start a new life. Although Toronto only had approximately 20,000 residents at the time, the city welcomed the newcomers with open arms. Over 1,100 new immigrants did not survive to make Canada their new home, with many perishing in fever sheds during the Typhus epidemic of 1847. Ireland Park is a tribute to all the Irish ancestors who came with only hope, for a new life in a promising country.

The park was designed to be an emotional and evocative place calling up long-lost memories of destitute ancestors who arrived from blight ravaged Ireland on our Canadian shore with hopes for a new life in a new land. The park was designed by Toronto Architect Jonathan Kearns, who is an Irish immigrant himself.  The park features oak trees, a cylinder of stacked glass that serves as a beacon of hope and five bronze sculptures created by renowned Irish sculptor Rowan Gillespie.
 The sculptures mirror a similar Famine Memorial in Dublin at the Custom House Quays.  The figures in Dublin represent The Departure with Toronto's sculptures being The Arrival.  The Hamilton Spectator described the work as follows:
"The early immigrants are now honoured at the Toronto waterfront park by five haunting bronze statues created by Irish sculptor Rowan Gillespie...One figure depicts a man lying on the ground, emaciated; another shows a pregnant woman clutching her bulging stomach, while behind her a meek child stands wide-eyed. One frail figure is bent over with hands clasped in prayer, contrasted by a man whose arms are extended to the sky in salvation."

The park also features an imposing wall made exclusively of limestone imported from Kilkenny with has the names of those who died in 1847.  The wall includes many of Toronto's citizens who gave their life to the Irish cause, including Bishop Michael Power.

The park was officially opened during a ceremony on June 21, 2007, which featured the President of Ireland, Mary McAleese, Ontario Premier Dalton McGuinty, Federal Finance Minister Jim Flaherty, Toronto Mayor David Miller, and the Chairman of the Ireland Park Foundation, Robert Kearns. Mary McAleese described the park as  "a memorial that links Ireland and Canada in a very, very powerful way, and brings that story right into the 21st century."

In 2009, a film entitled Death or Canada features Ireland Park and the dark story of 1847 and how it impacted the young city of Toronto.  The Chairman of Ireland Park, Robert Kearns, is a featured contributor.

Works

See also
Irish Commemorative Stone, Montreal

References

External links 

 Ireland Park site

Parks in Toronto
Great Famine (Ireland) monuments and memorials
Irish-Canadian culture in Ontario
Harbourfront, Toronto